The 1999 UEFA Super Cup was a football match played on 27 August 1999 between the 1998–99 UEFA Champions League winners, Manchester United, and Lazio, winners of the 1998–99 UEFA Cup Winners' Cup.

Against the odds, Lazio won the match 1–0, the winning goal coming from Chilean striker Marcelo Salas in the 35th minute. The match was played at a neutral venue, the Stade Louis II in Monaco, in front of 14,461 spectators.

This was the last Super Cup contested by the winners of the UEFA Cup Winners' Cup, as the tournament was discontinued after the 1998–99 season. Since 2000, it has been contested by the winners of the UEFA Champions League and the winners of the UEFA Cup/UEFA Europa League.

Venue
The Stade Louis II in Monaco has been the venue for the UEFA Super Cup since 1998. It was built in 1985, and is also the home of AS Monaco, who play in the French league system.

Teams

Match

Summary
Lazio scored the only goal of the game in the 35th minute when Marcelo Salas hit a shot from just inside the penalty box which goalkeeper Raimond van der Gouw got his hand to but failed to keep out as the ball went under his body.

Details

See also
1998–99 UEFA Champions League
1998–99 UEFA Cup Winners' Cup
Manchester United F.C. in European football
S.S. Lazio in European football

References

Super Cup
Super Cup
1999
Super Cup 1999
Super Cup 1999
International club association football competitions hosted by Monaco
UEFA Super Cup